Myf or MYF may refer to:

People
 A nickname for people named Myfanwy
 Myf Shepherd (born 1991), Australian fashion model
 Myf Warhurst (born 1974), Australian radio announcer and television personality

Other uses
 Montgomery Field, a public airport in San Diego, United States (IATA airport code)

See also
 MYF5, protein